State Route 184 (SR 184) is a  long east–west state highway in northwestern Ohio, a U.S. state.  The western terminus of SR 184 is at the U.S. Route 23 (US 23) freeway in Sylvania, at a five-ramp parclo AB-3 interchange that also serves as the southern terminus of US 223, as well as the northern terminus of SR 51.  The eastern terminus of SR 184 is at a diamond interchange with Interstate 75 in Toledo.

Created in the late 1960s, SR 184, which travels through Sylvania and Toledo, is known as Alexis Road from end-to-end.

Route description

For its entire length, SR 184 runs within the northern portion of Lucas County.  No part of SR 184 is included within the National Highway System.

History
SR 184 was applied in 1969.  It was designated along what was formerly, dually, a bypass route of US 24 and US 25, running from its present western terminus at the US 23 freeway in Sylvania to its intersection with Detroit Avenue, then a part of US 25, in Toledo.

Six years after it was established, SR 184 was extended east from the Detroit Avenue intersection to its current terminus at the northernmost interchange along I-75 in Ohio.  At the time, this was a newly constructed interchange along the Interstate.

Major intersections

References

External links

184
Transportation in Lucas County, Ohio